Kösterbeck is a nature reserve in the German state of Mecklenburg-Vorpommern, which was established in 1986. Its territory was expanded in 1990 and reduced on 13 June 1995. It derives its name from a stream flowing from east to west through the area, also called the Kösterbeck, a tributary of the Warnow.

Its conservation aim is to preserve and develop the very undulating and varied moraine landscape of Rostock Switzerland with a stream system and adjoining lean pasture, spring bogs and wet meadows.

Literature

References

External links 

Nature Reserve Act
Information at the M-V state portal
Map portal for the M-V environment with geodata  (reserve boundary, biotope mapping, etc.)

Kösterbeck
Protected areas established in 1986
1986 establishments in East Germany